The Hunt for Red October is a video game based on the 1984 book The Hunt for Red October by Tom Clancy. It was released in 1987 and was available for the Atari ST, Amiga, Apple II, Macintosh, ZX Spectrum, MSX, Commodore 64 and IBM PC. A port for the Apple IIGS was released in 1989. The player must navigate the Red October towards U.S. waters while avoiding the Soviet Navy. The game is a combination of submarine simulator and strategy game.

Reception 
Computer Gaming World in 1988 described it as an excellent submarine simulator, controlled entirely by mouse. The replay value of the game was also praised, as the Soviets change tactics with each game. A 1992 survey in the magazine of wargames with modern settings was much more negative, giving the game one and a half stars out of five and stating that it "probably did more to turn off purchasers to the wargame genre than any other product". Antic recommended the ST version of the Hunt for Red October to fans of the novel or submarine games.

See also 
 The Hunt for Red October, 1990 film

References

External links 

The Hunt for Red October – Based on the Book on the Amiga at the Hall of Light (HOL)

1987 video games
Amiga games
Amstrad CPC games
Apple II games
Apple IIGS games
Atari ST games
Commodore 64 games
DOS games
ZX Spectrum games
MSX games
Submarine simulation video games
Cold War video games
Video games based on The Hunt for Red October
Video games developed in the United Kingdom